Khvorneh or Khurneh may refer to:
 Khvorneh-ye Olya
 Khvorneh-ye Sofla